DeAndre Burnett (born January 21, 1994) is an American former professional basketball player.

Early life
Burnett was born in Miami Gardens, Florida. His brother is Minnesota Vikings running back Dalvin Cook.

College career
Burnett averaged 7.0 points per game as a redshirt freshman for the Miami Hurricanes, making 28 three-pointers.  He scored a season-high 21 points against Wisconsin-Green Bay. After the season, Burnett decided to transfer to Ole Miss. Burnett averaged 16.5 points and 3.2 assists per game but was sidelined by a late-season leg injury. As a senior, Burnett averaged 13.5 points and 3.9 assists per game shooting 36% from behind the arc.

Professional career
On September 19, 2018, Burnett signed with the Leicester Riders of the British Basketball League as a replacement for the injured Niem Stevenson. In November 2019, Burnett signed with Kharkivski Sokoly of the Ukrainian Basketball Superleague. He parted ways with the team on February 24, 2020.

References

External links
Ole Miss Rebels bio

1994 births
Living people
American expatriate basketball people in Ukraine
American men's basketball players
Basketball players from Kansas
BC Kharkivski Sokoly players
Miami Hurricanes men's basketball players
Ole Miss Rebels men's basketball players
Point guards
Shooting guards